"'Ti i Ja" is a song by Serbian pop-folk singer Saša Matić and Croatian pop singer Jelena Rozga, included on the former's album Dva života (2021). The pop ballad was written by Milan Miletić and produced by Matić. It was released as a single on 15 December 2021. The song was well received by music critics who praised the singers for their emotional rendition. Commercially, the song achieved success in Croatia and the former Yugoslav countries, peaking at number 9 on the Croatia Songs chart. The music video for the song is watched 9.4 million times on the video streaming platform YouTube as of May 2022. The duo performed the song live on several televised appearances, including on the Ami G show, during a promotional concert at the Esplanade Zagreb Hotel, the 2023 Music Awards Ceremony and later during their separate concert performances and gigs.

Background and reception
"Ti i Ja" was included on Matić's tenth studio album Dva života (2021). It was written by Milan Miletić and produced by Matić. The song marks the first collaboration between the two singers; talks about a collaboration had been going on for years, however, both singers were waiting patiently for the right song. Matić as the writer of the song sent a demo to Rozga in June 2020; immediately after hearing it, Rozga became emotional. While recording, the singer wanted to be alone to be able to emotionally render the song. The song was released as a single from the album on 15 December 2021.

Upon its release, the song was well-received by listeners and a writer of Story.hr dubbed it a "real music pleasure" for the singers' fanbases. It was nominated in the category for Best Collaboration at the 2023 Music Awards Ceremony which it also won.

Music video
A music video for the song, directed by Toxic Entertainment was released on 15 December 2021. A brief teaser of the video was released online on 13 December 2021. The video opens with footage of Matić playing the opening notes of the song on his piano. It goes on to show Rozga, whose face is seen on the mirror next to him, singing as a wine glass falls and gets spilled. The video then shows both Rozga and Matić singing the song to the camera next to a river in Belgrade where they are also surrounded by a piano and adornments. The second half of the video proceeds to shots of the two singers singing the song on an empty boat in an evening setting. The final scenes, show the duo singing the song while seated and facing each other, while flames can be seen on the lit candles behind them. After its release, the video became trending in all post-Yugoslav countries and garnered 1.5 million views only 3 days after its release. As of May 2022, it is watched more than 9.4 million times on the platform.

Live performances
The duo performed the songs several times on televised appearances. On 19 January, 2022, during a guest appearance at the Ami G Show, Matić and Rozga sang the duet in a piano version only. On 15 February 2022, the two appeared in Zagreb and sang the duet live during a promotional gathering for the album at Esplanade Zagreb Hotel. On 1 May 2022, Matić appeared together with Sanja Vučić on the Serbian talent show Nikad nije kasno where he performed the song on the 33rd episode. On 25 January 2023, the duo appeared together at the 2023 MAC Music Awards where they performed "Ti i Ja" live together.

Charts
For the week ending 19 February 2022, the single peaked at number nine on the Billboard Croatia Songs chart.

References

External links
 

2021 songs
2021 singles
 Croatian songs